Polyalthia rufescens is a species of plant in the Annonaceae family. It is native to Kerala and Tamil Nadu in India. It is threatened by habitat loss.

References

rufescens
Flora of Kerala
Flora of Tamil Nadu
Endangered plants
Taxonomy articles created by Polbot